Guillory is a surname. Notable people with the surname include:

 Anthony Guillory (born 1942), American football linebacker
 Curtis Guillory, American bishop
 Elbert Guillory (born 1944), Louisiana politician
 Isaac Guillory (1947–2000), American folk guitarist
 Jahking Guillory, American actor
 John Guillory (born 1952), American literary critic
 John Guillory (born 1945), former American football player
 Lorilei Guillory, subject of the 2003 play Lorilei
 Matt Guillory (born 1974), American musician
 Sienna Guillory (born 1975), English actress and model